(born in Tokyo, stylized as MADEMOISELLE YULIA) is a Japanese DJ and musician, associated with Tokyo electro scene. She debuted in 2008 as a DJ, and in 2011 as a singer, with her debut album Mademoworld.

Biography 

Mademoiselle Yulia was born in Tokyo . In high school, she began her musical career as the lead vocalist and guitarist for six years. The four member band performed punk, technopop and garage covers, taking inspiration from The Clash and Kraftwerk.

Yulia began organising parties in her second year at high school, in 2005. She was inspired to create her own electro DJ event in Tokyo called Neon Spread, after attending a similar DJ night in England. In 2008 she was signed to EMI Music Japan and released her debut mix-tape of the electro music featured in the events, Neon Spread. Mademoiselle Yulia began regularly attending DJ events and parties 2008, and met M-Flo rapper Verbal as they would often attend the same events. In late 2008 and 2009 she began to be featured on many albums as a collaborating artist, with many of these releases featuring Verbal. These songs included appearances on Teriyaki Boyz' second album Serious Japanese, Towa Tei's album Big Fun, and a solo track of hers produced by Verbal, "What Now?," featured on M-Flo's third outside collaborations album M-Flo Inside: Works Best III.

Mademoiselle Yulia was the featured vocalist for the come-back tour of 1970s/1980s Japanese techno band Plastics, on their May 2010 tour. She was listed as the number two "to watch" talent in Tokyo by CNNGo in 2010.

In mid-2011, preparations for her debut album Mademoworld began, beginning a worldwide tour Angee Yung Robotz in April with Verbal to promote the album, as well as Verbal's solo album Visionair. Verbal is the executive producer of her album, and the first single "Gimme Gimme" was released digitally on August 3, 2011. The album was released digitally on iTunes on September 21, followed by a CD release on October 5.

Mademoiselle Yulia will collaborate with M-Flo on their comeback song "Run," which is being used for sports shoe brand Reebok's Reethem & Lite campaign in Japan. The trio first performed the song at the launch party for the campaign, on September 15, 2011.

She has performed in concerts and DJ events with artists such as Towa Tei, M.I.A., Dexpistols, Shinichi Osawa and Boys Noize. Outside of music, she writes as a columnist in fashion magazine Nylon's Japanese edition, designed jewellery for accessory brand Giza and briefly hosted a show on music channel Space Shower, Mademoworld.

Discography

Studio albums

Mix tapes

Singles

Other appearances

References

External links
Official site 
Official EMI label site 
Official Twitter 

1987 births
Club DJs
Japanese electro musicians
Living people
Japanese DJs
Japanese-language singers
Japanese electronic musicians
Japanese socialites
Mixtape DJs
Musicians from Tokyo
Electronic dance music DJs